Kieselbronn is a municipality in the Enz district, in Baden-Württemberg.

History
Kieselbronn was sold in 1368 to Maulbronn Monastery, which itself became a possession of the Duchy of Württemberg in 1504. Kieselbronn was assigned to the Pforzheim district in 1819 and remained as such when Baden was reorganized in 1864 and on 25 June 1939. On 1 January 1973, was assigned to Enz district.

Geography
The municipality (Gemeinde) of Kieselbronn is located in the Enz district, within the state of Baden-Württemberg and Federal Republic of Germany. It is situated in the Kraichgau region, whose geology is made up largely of muschelkalk partially overlaid with loess, and sits above the Lettenkeuper Formation. The primary source of water in the municipal area is the Schlupfgraben, a tributary of the Enz that flows through the municipality from north to east.

Coat of arms

Kieselbronn's coat of arms depicts a golden duck's foot upon a field of red. The duck foot is a municipal motif that dates back to 1704 and began appearing on local boundary stones and seals at the end of the 18th century. The Baden State Archives gave the coat of arms its red and gold coloring in 1907 to match the coat of arms for the Grand Duchy of Baden.

Citations

External links

 Official website (in German)

Enzkreis
Baden